I'll Be Yours is a 1947 American musical comedy film directed by William A. Seiter and starring Deanna Durbin. Based on the play A jó tündér by Ferenc Molnár, the film is about a small-town girl who tells a fib to a wealthy businessman, which then creates complications. The play had earlier been adapted for the 1935 film The Good Fairy by Preston Sturges.

Plot
Louise Ginglebusher (Deanna Durbin) is a young woman from the small town of Cobbleskill who comes to New York City to make it in show business.  In a café, she's befriended by a kindhearted but ornery waiter, Wechsberg (William Bendix), and meets a bearded struggling attorney, George Prescott (Tom Drake).  She gets a job as an usherette from Mr. Buckingham (Walter Catlett), the owner of the prestigious Buckingham Music Hall, who's an old friend of her father.

While working at the Music Hall she meets Wechsberg again, and later when she is accosted by a masher, she gets rid of him by claiming that Wechsberg is her husband.  Wechsberg then invites her to come with him the next night when he works at an upscale social gathering at the Savoy Ritz.  Louise borrows a gown and comes to the party, where they get her past the headwaiter by claiming she's one of the entertainers.  Mingling, she meets the host, J. Conrad Nelson (Adolphe Menjou), a philandering meat magnate, who requests that Louise sing a song.  She does, so beautifully that Nelson offers to star her in a Broadway musical.  To discourage Nelson's obvious physical interest in her, Louise tell him that she's married, whereupon Nelson offers buy her out of her marriage by paying her husband for his loss.  Impetuously deciding to do a good deed, she gives Nelson the business card that George Prescott, the struggling lawyer, had given her, and tells him that George is her husband.

When Nelson visits George the next day in his shabby storefront law office, and offers to make him the legal representative for his company, George is suspicious and refuses the offer, but Nelson allays his concerns by telling the ethical young attorney that he needs an honest lawyer as a role model for his staff – the truth is he wants George on his staff so he can keep him occupied while he pursues Louise.  Many complications ensue after Louise gets George to shave off his old-man's beard, revealing the handsome young man underneath, and a stroll in the moonlight provokes George to propose marriage to Louise.

Cast

 Deanna Durbin as Louise Ginglebusher
 Tom Drake as George Prescott
 William Bendix as Wechsberg
 Adolphe Menjou as J. Conrad Nelson
 Walter Catlett as Mr. Buckingham

 Franklin Pangborn as Barber
 William Trenk as Captain
 Joan Shawlee as Blonde
 John Phillips as Thug

Cast notes:
Two years after making I'll Be Yours, Deanna Durbin retired from film acting. In an interview in 1981, she described her last four films – this movie, Something in the Wind (1947), Up in Central Park (1948), and For the Love of Mary (1948) – as "terrible". However another interview her last husband Charles David says she liked making movie except her last three – "she hated those" (not including I'll Be Yours).

Songs
I'll Be Yours was designed to be a vehicle for Deanna Durbin, and all the songs in it are sung by her.

"Granada" – words and music by Agustín Lara
"It's Dream Time" – by Walter Schumann (music) and Jack Brook (lyrics)
"Cobbleskill School Song" – by Walter Schumann (music) and Jack Brook (lyrics)
"Love's Own Sweet Song" – by Emmerich Kalman (music) and Catherine Chisholm Cushing and E. P. Heath (lyrics)
"Sari Waltz"
"Brahms' Lullaby" – by Johannes Brahms

Production
In December 1940 Universal announced that Durbin would star in Susi a remake of The Good Fairy to be directed by Henry Koster, produced by Joe Pasternak and written by Norman Krasna. She was to make it following Ready for Romance and before The Phantom of the Opera. Plans to make these films were postponed so Durbin could make It Started with Eve. Eventually Pasternak and Koster both left Universal; Ready for Romance was never made, and Durbin elected not to do Phantom of the Opera

In January 1946 the project was reactivated – Universal announced it would be Durbin's first film back after having a baby, and would be called Josephine. In April Morrie Ryskind was reportedly writing the script. In June 1946 it was announced that William Seiter would direct the movie, now called I'll Be Yours. In August Adolphe Menjou joined the cast. Tom Drake was borrowed from MGM.

Filming started August 13, 1946. It was the first movie made at Universal after they merged with International Pictures. Background scenes were shot on location in New York City. It was released on 2 February 1947. Among other taglines, it was marketed with "Heaven Protects the Working Girl...but who protects the guy she's WORKING to get?"

Tom Drake fell ill during filming and Durbin had to shoot around him.

In November 1946 producer and writer Felix Jackson, who was married to Durbin, asked for and received a release from his contract with Universal. He agreed to supervise the final edit of I'll Be Yours. (Jackson's marriage to Durbin would end and she married Charles David.)

Other versions and adaptations
Before being adapted by Preston Sturges for the 1935 film The Good Fairy, the Molnár play had been presented on Broadway with Helen Hayes playing "Lu" for 151 performances in 1931–1932, with another production playing 68 performances later that year.  Preston Sturges used his screenplay for that earlier film as the basis for the 1951 Broadway musical Make a Wish, which had music and lyrics by Hugh Martin.

On January 23, 1950 Lux Radio Theatre broadcast a one-hour radio adaptation of I'll Be Yours, with William Bendix and Ann Blyth. For television, Hallmark Hall of Fame presented The Good Fairy on NBC in 1956, produced by Maurice Evans, directed by George Schaefer, and starring Julie Harris, Walter Slezak and Cyril Ritchard.

References
Notes

External links
 
 
 
 

1947 films
1947 musical comedy films
1947 romantic comedy films
American musical comedy films
American romantic comedy films
American romantic musical films
American black-and-white films
American films based on plays
Films based on works by Ferenc Molnár
Films directed by William A. Seiter
Films set in New York City
Universal Pictures films
Films with screenplays by Preston Sturges
Films scored by Frank Skinner
1940s American films